Lounes Laouzai (born 26 December 1989) is an Algerian former professional footballer who played as a defender.

Career
Laouzai was born in Tizi Ouzou. He signed with MC Alger from JS Bordj Ménaïel in the summer of 2007. In 2009, he joined Topvar Topoľčany in the Slovak Second League. In 2010, he returned to Algeria and signed with MC Saïda.

References

1989 births
Living people
Algerian Muslims
Footballers from Tizi Ouzou
Kabyle people
Algerian footballers
Association football defenders
MC Alger players
MC Saïda players
JS Bordj Ménaïel players
MFK Topvar Topoľčany players
Algerian expatriate footballers
Algerian expatriate sportspeople in Slovakia
Expatriate footballers in Slovakia

21st-century Algerian people